Alexander Cattanach (26 October 1856 – 3 September 1928) was a Scottish architect, prominent in the late 19th century and early 20th century. His designs ranged from cinema buildings to villas to schools.

Early life
Mackenzie was born on 26 October 1856, the son of Donald and Jane.

Career
Following in his father's footsteps, Cattanach trained as a stonemason but turned to architecture, practising in Kingussie.

Selected notable works
Duke of Gordon Hotel, Kingussie (1906)
Craigmhor Hotel, Newtonmore (extensive additions, 1909)

Personal life
Cattanach had five sons, of whom two (Donald and Alexander Jr.) were architects, one (Andrew) a road surveyor, one (William) was an engineer and one (Evan) a farmer.

Cattanach dies on 3 September 1928, aged 71.

References

1856 births
1928 deaths
19th-century Scottish architects
20th-century Scottish architects
People from Kingussie